Voisey's Bay is a bay of the Atlantic Ocean in Labrador, Canada. The bay is heavily indented with numerous inlets and islands and is extremely rocky. It is the site of the Voisey's Bay Mine.

There is a village called Voisey in France.

References 

Bays of Newfoundland and Labrador
Labrador